The Yorke–Talbot slavery opinion was a legal opinion issued by two Crown law officers in 1729 relating to the legality of slavery under English law.

Background
The opinion was sought by slave merchants after certain judicial decisions by Lord Chief Justice Holt.  Earlier judicial decisions had upheld the legality of slavery in relation to African slaves on the basis that they were infidels. However, in Chamberlain v Harvey (1697) 1 Ld Raym 146 and in Smith v Gould (1705–07) 2 Salk 666 Lord Holt rejected this approach, but suggested on a wider basis that slaves were not chattels capable of supporting a legal property claim. The clear concern of the slave traders was that, at best, Christian Africans could not be slaves, and that baptism would manumit a slave (and in fact a number of slaves were baptised and claimed on this basis to be free), and at worst, there might be no legally enforceable property rights in a slave.  Views had also been expressed that, whatever the position of slaves in the colonies, a slave in England could not be restrained against his will.

The opinion was written by Sir Philip Yorke (then the Attorney General) and Charles Talbot (then the Solicitor General), each of whom would later rise to the rank of Lord Chancellor as Lord Hardwicke and Lord Talbot respectively.  They wrote the opinion in their capacity as law officers of the Crown, and so was only an opinion and not a judgment of a court. Nevertheless, the opinion was taken by slaveowners as establishing the legitimacy of slavery in England, despite its lack of support from precedent.

Opinion
Yorke and Talbot opined that under English law:

a slave's status did not change when he came to England,
a slave could be compelled to return to the colonies from England, and
that baptism would not manumit (free) a slave.

They summarised the following:

The opinion cited no authorities, and set out no legal rationale for the views expressed in it, but it was widely published and relied upon.  The opinion was largely accepted in England as a definitive statement of the law for nearly 40 years. Curiously, the opinion made no reference either to the abolition of trade in serfs of 1102 by the Council of Westminster, or to the decision in In the matter of Cartwright, 11 Elizabeth; 2 Rushworth's Coll 468 (1569), a case often cited as authority for the statement "that England has too pure an air for a slave to breathe in." Nor did it refer to the two decisions of Lord Holt (Chamberlain v Harvey and Smith v Gould) which led to so much of the controversy.

Aftermath
Yorke subsequently endorsed the views expressed in the opinion (although not expressly referring to it) whilst sitting in his judicial capacity as Lord Chancellor in Pearne v Lisle (1749) Amb 75, 27 ER 47. However, in 1772, Lord Mansfield held that no person could be forcibly removed from England as a slave in England in Somersett's case on application for habeas corpus made on behalf of the escaped slave, James Somersett. Yet mindful of Hardwicke's holding in Pearne v Lisle that English law would apply throughout the British Empire, and conscious of the economic ruin which the sudden abolition of slavery would cause in the colonies, Mansfield limited his ruling territorially.

Ultimately slavery would be abolished by statute in both England and throughout the colonies pursuant to the Slavery Abolition Act 1833.

See also
 Slavery at common law

Footnotes

References

External links
National Archives site

Legal history of England
Slavery in the United Kingdom
1729 in British law
1729 in England
Slavery in the British Empire